Tom, Dick and Harriet is a British sitcom that was broadcast for two series from 1982 to 1983. It was created by the sitcom writing team of Johnnie Mortimer and Brian Cooke, and it starred veteran actor Lionel Jeffries in one of his few television roles, only seven months after his previous TV sitcom role in Father Charlie, Ian Ogilvy (who had a few years before been cast as Simon Templar a.k.a. The Saint in Return of the Saint), and Brigit Forsyth (best known for her role as Thelma Ferris in The Likely Lads/Whatever Happened to the Likely Lads?).

It was made by Thames Television for the ITV network.

Plot
Thomas Maddison (played by Jeffries) had spent 40 years living in the deepest Cornwall countryside, and hen-pecked at that; his late wife banned him from smoking, drinking, and even casually looking at other women. Upon becoming a widower, Maddison, unable to wait to break free from the shackles that had bound him for so long, heads off to the bright lights of London, where his son Richard (Dick) (played by Ogilvy) lives with his wife Harriet (played by Forsyth). Suffice to say, his rather primitive manners, his disgusting habits, and his womanising creates havoc for his son and his daughter-in-law, both of them being well-manicured executives; him in advertising, her in magazine publishing. However, in the second series, Harriet conceives and (in a rather speedy nine months) delivers Richard a son and Thomas a grandson.

Episodes

Series one (1982)

1.1. On The Town (13 September 1982)
1.2. Where There's A Will (20 September 1982)
1.3. Currying Favour (27 September 1982)
1.4. The Last Time I Saw Paris (4 October 1982)
1.5. Dog in the Manger (11 October 1982)
1.6. Paternal Triangle (18 October 1982)

Series two (1983)
2.1. A Room with a View (13 January 1983)
2.2. Baby Blues (20 January 1983)
2.3. Country Life (27 January 1983)
2.4. From Here To Maternity (3 February 1983)
2.5. None Shall Sleep (10 February 1983)
2.6. Get Out And Get Under (17 February 1983)

Ratings
Ratings for the first series were very strong, with each episode being watched by between 11.3 and 13.75 million, with all but one of the episodes in the top five of the TV charts. Ratings for the second series were lower, with the first five episodes failing to make the ITV-only top ten, at a time when 13 million was needed to enter it. However, the final episode ranked fourth in the overall TV charts, with 14.6 million watching.

Other versions
Like other Thames sitcoms of the 1980s, the format of Tom, Dick and Harriet was sold to the US, through the US TV producer and executive Don L. Taffner, who distributed Thames material to US TV in both format and syndication. It was sold to CBS in the same year that the original series finished in the UK, and the US version was named Foot at the Door. D.L. Taffner's production company managed to make 6 episodes of it after which it was cancelled. In the US version, the widower was named Jonah Foot, and he was played by Harold Gould. Foot had lived in New Hampshire, and following his wife's death he moved to New York City, living in the Manhattan apartment of his son Jim, played by Kenneth Gilman, and his wife Harriet, played by Diana Canova, best known for her roles in Soap (TV series) and later in Throb.

However, in 1993, 10 years after the second and last series of Tom, Dick and Harriet aired on ITV, its format was sold to the Netherlands. The Dutch version was called Het Zonnetje in Huis. The Dutch version ran for 9 series over 10 years, from 1993 to 2003. It originally began on the Netherlands Public Broadcasting, and it was made by one of its main constituent members VARA. VARA made the first 2 series in 1993 and 1994, after which It moved to the commercial station RTL 4, who made it until the end. In the Dutch version, the widower was named Piet Bovenkerk, played by John Kraaijkamp, Sr., who moved to the Amsterdam apartment of his son Erik, played by Kraaijkamp, Sr.'s son Johnny Kraaijkamp, Jr., and his wife Catharina, played by Martine Bijl.

Stunt Incident

During location filming with Ogilvy for one of the episodes, a stunt involving a car and a lake went very badly wrong, ending up with Jeffries only just managing to get out of the car's front window before the vehicle sank in 45 feet of water.

References

 Mark Lewisohn, BBC Online Comedy Guide/Radio Times Guide to TV Comedy
 British TV Online Resources

External links

1982 British television series debuts
1983 British television series endings
1980s British sitcoms
ITV sitcoms
Television shows produced by Thames Television
Television series by Fremantle (company)
English-language television shows
Television shows shot at Teddington Studios